1019 is the debut studio album by Taiwanese singer Jolin Tsai. It was released on September 10, 1999, by Universal and D Sound. Produced by David Wu, Peter Lee, and Paul Lee, it incorporated genres of pop, hip-hop, R&B, and world music to showcase Tsai's musical talent and versatility.

It was well received by music critics, who commented that the girlish sentiment exuded from the album filled the vacancy of the girl-next-door singer in the Taiwan music scene at the time, Tsai's idol vibe and strength combined with the excellent production made her become an instant hit. The album sold more than 450,000 copies in Taiwan.

Background and development 
In May 1998, Tsai participated in a television singing competition show produced by MTV Mandarin and eventually won the competition. The judge Wawa Chen said: "She is really a born singer, she is singing with her talent." Another judge Lee Cheng-fan said: "I think it would be exciting to help her make a record." Universal Music Taiwan's music director Sam Chen described that Tsai looked totally different on stage and off stage during the competition. She looked like a quiet student in uniform when she was off stage, but she looked like that she had much potential to be a superstar when she was on stage.

In March 1999, Tsai signed a recording contract with Universal, and she became the label's key new artist of the year. Later, Universal arranged a series of courses for Tsai, including twice-weekly dance classes to help her improve stage performance, twice-weekly makeup classes to help her do makeup on her own when she would be pressed for schedules, and speech classes to help her face the journalists. In addition, the label arranged for her to fly to Ireland, Japan, the United States, and the United Kingdom to watch foreign singers' live performances.

On July 16, 1999, Tsai released her debut single, "Living with the World", and announced the release of her debut album in September 1999. It was a promotional song for 7-Eleven in Taiwan, and was only available for sale in the 7-Eleven stores. The single sold more than 20,000 copies in Taiwan within the first two weeks of release.

Writing and recording 

"The Rose" and "Good-Bye" were both recorded at the Quad Studios in New York City, and eight black backing vocalists were invited to provide the vocal harmony for the two tracks, showing a majestic momentum like choir. "I Know You're Feeling Blue", "Blame It on the Age", and "Emptiness" are all marketable ballads, and the young Tsai showed a rare mastery in performing such songs. "Out on the Street" is a Chinese version of Korean duo Idol's "A Song Story", and it is a hip-hop dance song. "Who Are You" and "Living with the World" also showed her versatility in musical performance.

Title and artwork 
The "10" in the album's title pronounced exactly the same as Tsai's first name "I-lin" in Mandarin, which refers to the singer herself, while the "19" refers to Tsai's age at the time. The fresh and shy girl-next-door image is the dominant temperament of the album, so the cover of the album's standard edition is a picture of Tsai's gloomy side face. The cover of the album's recelebration edition features Tsai wearing a midriff-baring outfit.

Universal tagged her as an "idol singer", in order to play up her 19-year-old, study-well, and love-singing image, her first visual image of the album is a quiet look of her in a small white dress, followed by a healthy, sexy look showing her midriff. Universal said: "When we first met Jolin Tsai, we noticed her 'dual personality'—she looks shy, quiet, and studious from the outside, but has tattoos, and very expressive on stage. She's got both the shyness of good girl and the aggressiveness of young generation simultaneously, which is very special."

Release and promotion 
The standard edition features two CDs, which contain ten songs and instrumentals of two of the songs. On October 15, 1999, Universal released the celebration edition of the album in celebration of the album's sales exceeding 200,000 copies in Taiwan. The edition integrated the ten songs into one CD and additionally includes a photo book, but it removed the two instrumentals. On December 4, 1999, Tsai held the 1019 I Can Concert in Taipei, Taiwan. On December 13, 1999, Universal released the recelebration edition in celebration of the sales exceeding 350,000 copies in Taiwan, which additionally includes six music videos and a short documentary film. On January 15, 2000, Universal released the school start celebration edition in celebration of the sales exceeding 400,000 copies in Taiwan, and it incorporated all the content of the previous two editions.

Singles and music videos 
Tsai released two singles for the album—"The Rose" and "I Know You're Feeling Blue". Both music videos of the two songs were directed by Chou Ko-tai, and "I Know You're Feeling Blue" reached number 30 on the Taiwan's Hit FM Top 100 Singles of the Year chart. In addition, the music video of "Blame It on the Age" was directed by Marlboro Lai and features Taiwanese actor Lin Yo-wei. Both music videos of "Good-Bye" and "Emptiness" were directed by Tony Lin.

Critical reception 
Tencent Entertainment's Shuwa commented: "Although the ten songs from her first album sound a little moderate when comparing to her later albums, but as the debut album to make her become an instant hit, as long as there's a song that can touch people's hearts, then it's half the battle, and "I Know You're Feeling Blue" showed Tsai's girlish side in front of everyone. In terms of the integrity of the whole album, the girlish sentiment exuded from both upbeat songs and ballads from the album just filled the vacancy of the girl-next-door singer in the Taiwan music scene at the time. Thus, the ‘right time’, ‘right place’, and ’right people’ made her become an instant hit. Of course, the success of the album is due to the excellent production of producers David Wu, Peter Lee, and Paul Lee, especially the two Lee, who made great contribution to Tsai's later works."

Sina Entertainment commented: "[Tsai] released her first album 1019 as the year's key new artist in September 1999, In the battle of new artists at the time, her own advantageous combination of idol vibe and strength, with the help of the label's overall strategy, set off as high as more than 400,000 copies sales that others were hard to beat, the popularity of the "Teenage Boy Killer" drew more than 5,000 fans to attend her first I Can Concert at Nankang 101, which set a rare record among new artists and let the people see a new diva emerged."

Sina News Hong Kong commented: "Jolin Tsai, the 19-year-old rising star from Taiwan, broke into the music scene by winning a singing competition, her appearance is described as a little bit like Ruby Lin, her singing skills are closer to those who have talent, with her R&B style, she must have a solid groundwork. Those songs on the album are mostly R&B, sound a little bit mainstream, nothing special, but every song has a certain quality, with her image and singing skills, the album was still a competitive album among Taiwanese new artists in 1999."

Accolades 
Tsai won a UFO People's Choice Award for Favorite New Artist (copper), a China Music Award for Favorite Female New Artist, a Singapore Hit Award for Best New Artist (gold), a Top Music Chart Award for Best New Artist, and a TVB8 Mandarin Music On Demand Award for Best New Artist (silver). "I Know You're Feeling Blue" won an UFO People's Choice Award for Top Songs.

Track listing

Release history

References

External links 
 
 

1999 debut albums
Jolin Tsai albums
Universal Music Taiwan albums